Nicolaas (Nico) Cortlever (14 June 1915, in Amsterdam – 5 April 1995) was a Dutch chess master.

He tied for 7-8th at Rotterdam 1936 (10th NED-ch, Salo Landau won); took 2nd at Amsterdam 1938 (11th NED-ch, Max Euwe won); won at the 2nd Hoogovens Beverwijk 1939 (Quadrangular); tied for 4-6th at Amsterdam I and 3rd-4th at Amsterdam II in 1939.

During World War II, he tied for 2nd-3rd at Beverwijk 1940 (Quadrangular, Euwe won); shared 1st with Landau and Lodewijk Prins at Leeuwarden 1940; took 2nd, behind Arthur Wijnans at Beverwijk 1941 (Quadrangular); tied for 14-15th at Munich 1941 (the 2nd Europaturnier, Gösta Stoltz won).

After the war, he took 4th at Beverwijk 1946 (Alberic O'Kelly de Galway won); tied for 2nd-3rd at Zaandam 1946 (László Szabó won); took 2nd at Beverwijk 1947 (Theo van Scheltinga won); tied for 8-9th at Beverwijk 1948 (Prins won); took 4th at Beverwijk 1950 (Jan Hein Donner won).

He took 4th at Amsterdam 1950 (15th NED-ch, Euwe won); tied for 7-9th at Enschede 1952 (16th NED-ch, Euwe won); tied for 9-10th at Beverwijk 1953 (Nicolas Rossolimo won); tied for 2nd-3rd at Amsterdam 1954 (17th NED-ch, Donner won); took 2nd, behind Donner, at Amsterdam 1958 (19th NED-ch).

Cortlever represented The Netherlands in Chess Olympiads:
In 1936, at eighth board in 3rd unofficial Chess Olympiad in Munich (+4 –5 =9);
In 1939, at second board in 8th Chess Olympiad in Buenos Aires (+3 –2 =11);
In 1950, at fourth board in 9th Chess Olympiad in Dubrovnik (+6 –0 =5);
In 1952, at fourth board in 10th Chess Olympiad in Helsinki (+6 –3 =4);
In 1954, at third board in 11th Chess Olympiad in Amsterdam (+1 –3 =4).
He won individual silver medal at Dubrovnik 1950.

Cortlever was awarded the International Master (IM) title in 1950.

References

1915 births
1995 deaths
Dutch chess players
Chess International Masters
Chess Olympiad competitors
Sportspeople from Amsterdam
20th-century chess players